Hasan Kandi (also Romanized as Ḩasan Kandī) is a village in Marhemetabad Rural District, in the Central District of Miandoab County, West Azerbaijan Province, Iran. At the 2006 census, its population was 800, in 184 families.

References 

Populated places in Miandoab County